William F. Passannante (February 10, 1920 – December 15, 1996) was an American politician and attorney who served in the New York State Assembly from 1955 to 1990.

Early life and education 
Passannante was born and raised in Greenwich Village. He was the baptismal godson of Tammany Hall boss Carmine De Sapio. After attending public schools, Passannante earned a Bachelor of Science from New York University in 1940. He served in the United States Army during World War II and later earned a Juris Doctor from Harvard Law School.

Career 
From 1949 to 1953, Passannante served as an assistant United States Attorney for the Southern District of New York. In 1954, he served as Legislative Counsel to the President of the New York City Council. He was elected to the New York State Assembly in 1954, and served until his retirement in 1990.

Death 
He died of pancreatic cancer on December 15, 1996, in Manhattan, New York City, New York at age 76.

Passannante is the namesake of the William F. Passannante Ballfield in Greenwich Village.

References

1920 births
1996 deaths
Deputy Speakers of the New York State Assembly
Democratic Party members of the New York State Assembly
20th-century American politicians
New York University alumni
Harvard Law School alumni